Ojeda may refer to:

Places
Ciudad Ojeda, city in Venezuela

Municipalities in Spain
Báscones de Ojeda 
La Vid de Ojeda
Micieces de Ojeda 
Olmos de Ojeda 
Payo de Ojeda 
Prádanos de Ojeda

Surname
Ojeda (surname)